Kevin Henderson is a former Scotland international rugby league footballer. Henderson previously played in Australia for the Newcastle Knights and in England for the Leigh Centurions and Wakefield Trinity Wildcats (Heritage № 1228). Both of his brothers, Andrew (23 caps) and Ian (8 caps) have also played for Scotland.

Background
Henderson was born in Torquay, Devon, England.

Playing career
Henderson played only a handful of NRL games for the Newcastle Knights team, however played mostly in reserve grade. He also played reserve grade for the South Sydney Rabbitohs, and Central Coast Bears.
He came to England to pursue his professional career in 2005. He joined Leigh in super league before transferring mid-season to rival super league club the Wakefield Trinity Wildcats.
Henderson is one of three brothers playing rugby league, along with Ian Henderson and Andrew Henderson. Henderson played for the Montpellier Agglomération Rugby XIII in the Elite One Championship.

Representative career
The Hendersons are a Scottish family and all three brothers played for Scotland at international level, he won five caps for Scotland, appearing in an international against France in 2007, before appearing in the world cup qualifier against Wales. He featured in all three World Cup Finals matches held in Australia in 2008.

All three brothers featured in the Scotland squad for the 2008 Rugby League World Cup.

References

External links

(archived by web.archive.org) Kevin Henderson Wakefield Profile
Three brothers make rugby team
Henderson trio in Scots cup squad
Rugby League World Cup as it happened
Scotland 'must improve' in final
Leeds 34-26 Wakefield
Clockwatch: Wakefield 29-17 Cas
Super League XII - ins and outs
Wakefield 36-24 Salford
Leeds 22-14 Wakefield
Leigh bolster squad with NRL duo
Henderson signs new Wildcats deal
Henderson clinches Wakefield move
(archived by web.archive.org) Hendersons will all be there as season sprints towards finale with family ties
(archived by web.archive.org) NRL stats
(archived by web.archive.org) Kevin Henderson Souths Profile

1981 births
Living people
English rugby league players
Kevin
Leigh Leopards players
Montpellier Red Devils players
Newcastle Knights players
Rugby league centres
Rugby league players from Devon
Rugby league second-rows
Scotland national rugby league team players
Sportspeople from Torquay
Wakefield Trinity players